Domien Jacob (8 June 1897 – 5 November 1984) was a Belgian gymnast who competed in the 1920 Summer Olympics. He was born and died in Sint-Niklaas. In 1920 he won the silver medal as member of the Belgian gymnastics team in the European system event.

References

External links
profile

1897 births
1984 deaths
Belgian male artistic gymnasts
Olympic gymnasts of Belgium
Gymnasts at the 1920 Summer Olympics
Olympic silver medalists for Belgium
Olympic medalists in gymnastics
Medalists at the 1920 Summer Olympics
Sportspeople from Sint-Niklaas
20th-century Belgian people